"Marblehead Johnson" is a song by English indie rock band the Bluetones, released as a standalone single in 1996. It peaked at number seven on the UK Singles Chart in late September 1996. It was also included on the band's 2006 compilation, A Rough Outline: The Singles & B-Sides 95 – 03. The song was written as a tribute to Bill Hicks.

Music video
The members of the Bluetones spent the day wearing full prosthetic fat suits. The usually skinny guys carry on regular band activities like rocking out, having a kick-around, going for a drive, walking, making tea etc., but now as four hundred pound men. Frontman Mark Morriss said they got the idea for the video while watching the French and Saunders sketch where the two comediennes play big fat men.

Mark sports a Liverpool Football Club jersey over his padded fat suit. As well as donning the suits and masks, the boys also wore slip-on rubber fat hands to complete the illusion of them being overweight. Eds and Adam's suits also came with rubber man boobs and fat bellies that can only be seen briefly in the making-of featurette.

Dom and Nic, who were responsible for the Bluetones' Bluetonic promo, also directed this video.

Track listings
UK CD single
 "Marblehead Johnson"
 "The Simple Things"
 "Nifkin's Bridge"
 "Are You Blue or Are You Blind?" (not listed on artwork or disc)

UK 7-inch and cassette single
 "Marblehead Johnson"
 "The Simple Things"

Charts

References

External links
 https://archive.org/details/thebluetonesgetfatmakingofmarbleheadjohnsonfatsuits

The Bluetones songs
1996 singles
1996 songs
Song recordings produced by Hugh Jones (producer)
Songs written by Adam Devlin
Songs written by Eds Chesters
Songs written by Mark Morriss
Songs written by Scott Morriss